Tigidia is a genus of brushed trapdoor spiders first described by Eugène Simon in 1892.

Species
 it contains twelve species:
Tigidia alluaudi (Simon, 1902) – Madagascar
Tigidia bastardi (Simon, 1902) – Madagascar
Tigidia dubia (Strand, 1907) – Madagascar
Tigidia konkanensis Mirza, Zende & Patil, 2016 – India
Tigidia majori (Pocock, 1903) – Madagascar
Tigidia mathiauxi (Simon, 1902) – Madagascar
Tigidia mauriciana Simon, 1892 (type) – Mauritius
Tigidia nilgiriensis Sanap, Mirza & Siliwal, 2011 – India
Tigidia processigera (Strand, 1907) – Madagascar
Tigidia rutilofronis Sanap, Mirza & Siliwal, 2011 – India
Tigidia sahyadri Siliwal, Gupta & Raven, 2011 – India
Tigidia typica (Strand, 1907) – Madagascar

References

Barychelidae
Mygalomorphae genera
Spiders of Africa
Spiders of the Indian subcontinent
Taxa named by Eugène Simon